14 Sagittarii is a single, orange-hued star in the southern zodiac constellation of Sagittarius. It is faintly visible to the naked eye under good seeing conditions, having an apparent visual magnitude of 5.49. The star is moving closer to the Sun with a heliocentric radial velocity of around −59 km/s.

This is an evolved giant star with a stellar classification of K2 III, having exhausted the supply of hydrogen at its core and moved off the main sequence. It is a suspected variable star, possibly of the micro-variable variety, having an amplitude of less than 0.03 in magnitude. 14 Sagittarii is radiating about 317 times the Sun's luminosity from its photosphere at an effective temperature of around 3,940 K.

References

K-type giants
Suspected variables
Sagittarius (constellation)
Durchmusterung objects
Sagittarii, 14
167036
089369
6816